Hanerahu (also called Anerahu) is an uninhabited Estonian islet with surface area of 1.2 hectares. It lies south-east of Hiiumaa island and is part of Pühalepa Municipality. The islet belongs to Hiiumaa Islets Landscape Reserve.

See also
 List of islands of Estonia

Estonian islands in the Baltic
Hiiumaa Parish